Gulnaz Eduardovna Khatuntseva (née Badykova; born 21 April 1994) is a Russian professional racing cyclist of Tatar descent, who currently rides for UCI Women's Continental Team . She rode at the 2015 UCI Track Cycling World Championships.

Major results

2013
 1st  Team pursuit, UEC European Under-23 Track Championships (with Alexandra Chekina, Maria Mishina and Svetlana Kashirina)
2014
 1st  Team pursuit, UEC European Under-23 Track Championships (with Tamara Balabolina, Alexandra Chekina and Aleksandra Goncharova)
2015
 UEC European Under-23 Track Championships
1st  Points race
3rd  Team pursuit (with Tamara Balabolina, Alexandra Chekina and Natalia Mozharova)
 2nd  Team pursuit, UEC European Track Championships (with Tamara Balabolina, Alexandra Chekina and Maria Savitskaya)
 2nd Omnium, Grand Prix Minsk 
2016
 3rd Scratch, Memorial of Alexander Lesnikov
2017
 2nd Points race, UEC European Track Championships
 3rd Madison, Grand Prix Minsk (with Tamara Balabolina)
 Grand Prix of Moscow
3rd Madison (with Tamara Balabolina)
3rd Points race
2018
 International Belgian Track Meeting
1st Points race
2nd Madison (with Anastasia Yakovenko)

References

External links
 

1994 births
Living people
Russian female cyclists
Cyclists from Moscow
Russian track cyclists
European Games competitors for Russia
Cyclists at the 2019 European Games
Olympic cyclists of Russia
Cyclists at the 2020 Summer Olympics
Medalists at the 2020 Summer Olympics
Olympic medalists in cycling
Olympic bronze medalists for the Russian Olympic Committee athletes
Volga Tatars
Tatar sportspeople
Tatar people of Russia
21st-century Russian women